Peter Allen (born Peter Richard Woolnough; 10 February 1944 – 18 June 1992) was an Australian singer-songwriter, musician and entertainer, known for his flamboyant stage persona, boundless energy, and lavish costumes. His songs were made popular by many recording artists, including Elkie Brooks, Melissa Manchester and Olivia Newton-John, including Newton-John's first chart topping hit "I Honestly Love You", and the chart topping and Academy Award winning "Arthur's Theme (Best That You Can Do)" by Christopher Cross. In addition to recording many albums, he enjoyed a cabaret and concert career, including appearances at the Radio City Music Hall riding a camel. His patriotic song "I Still Call Australia Home", has been used extensively in advertising campaigns, and was added to the National Film and Sound Archive's Sounds of Australia registry in 2013.

Allen was the first husband of Liza Minnelli. They met in October 1964, were engaged on 26 November 1964, married on 3 March 1967, formally separated on 9 April 1970, and divorced on 24 July 1974. He had a long-term partner, model Gregory Connell (1949–1984). They met in 1973 and were together from 1974 until Connell's death in 1984. Allen and Connell died from AIDS-related cancer eight years apart, with Allen becoming one of the first well-known Australians to die from AIDS. Allen remained ambiguous about his sexuality in that he did not pretend to be straight after divorcing Minnelli, but never publicly came out as gay either. In a 1991 interview with the gay newspaper New York Native, he explained, "I was 'out' on stage years before anyone else. But I think outing is limiting. I don't feel like I should be labeled." Despite Allen's outgoing persona, he was an intensely private man who shared little about his personal life even with those close to him. Few people knew he had HIV/AIDS, partly in fear of alienating his conservative, heterosexual fans and thinking audiences would not want to see a performer they knew was sick. In 1998, a musical about his life, The Boy from Oz, debuted in Australia. It ran on Broadway and earned Hugh Jackman a Tony Award for Best Actor in a Musical.

Early life
Peter Allen was born Peter Richard Woolnough on 10 February 1944, to Richard John Woolnough, soldier and grocer, and his wife, Marion Bryden (née Davidson) in Tenterfield, New South Wales, a small Australian country town where his grandfather, George Woolnough, worked as a saddler. He had one sibling, a younger sister named Lynne. Allen grew up in nearby Armidale, and lived there from about six weeks of age until the age of fourteen. This is also where he first learned piano and dance. Allen's performing career began when he was eleven, playing the piano in the ladies' lounge of the New England Hotel in Armidale. His father became a violent alcoholic after returning from World War II. In November 1958, he committed suicide by gunshot when Allen was fourteen. Soon after his father's suicide, Allen left school with an Intermediate Certificate and moved to Lismore with his mother and sister to live with relatives. His grandfather, George Woolnough, never understood or got over this devastating event. This tale is told in Allen's 1972 song, "Tenterfield Saddler".

In 1959, Allen went to Surfers Paradise to look for work and met Chris Bell, an English-born singer-guitarist. Assisted by Chris Bell's father Peter Bell, and inspired by the Everly Brothers, they formed a singing duo called the Allen Brothers. He began performing as "Peter Allen" around the same time. Within a year, they were based in Sydney performing on the Australian music television program Bandstand. In 1964, Mark Herron, the husband of Judy Garland, discovered the Allen Brothers while they were performing in Hong Kong. They became Judy Garland's opening act when she toured. Charmed by Allen, Judy served as matchmaker between him and her daughter, Liza Minnelli. The Allen Brothers act broke up in the spring of 1970.

Career
Allen started releasing solo recordings in 1971, but throughout his career achieved greater success through his songs being recorded by others. He scored his biggest success with the song "I Honestly Love You", which he co-wrote with Jeff Barry and which became a major hit in 1974 for Olivia Newton-John. Her single reached number one in the United States and Canada and won two Grammy Awards, for Record of the Year and Best Female Pop Vocal Performance for Newton-John. Allen also co-wrote "Don't Cry Out Loud" with Carole Bayer Sager, popularized by Melissa Manchester in 1978, and "I'd Rather Leave While I'm in Love", also co-written with Bayer Sager and popularized by Rita Coolidge in 1979. One of his signature songs, "I Go to Rio", co-written with Adrienne Anderson, was popularized in America by the group Pablo Cruise.

In 1976, Allen released an album, Taught by Experts, which reached number one in Australia, along with the number one single "I Go to Rio" and the Top 10 hit "The More I See You". The album also included the song "Quiet Please, There's A Lady On Stage" which was recorded by many artists including Jack Jones and Dusty Springfield. Although his recording career in the US never progressed, he performed in Atlantic City and at Carnegie Hall. He had three extended sold-out engagements at New York City's Radio City Music Hall, where he became the first male dancer to dance with The Rockettes and rode a camel during "I Go to Rio". This performance was broadcast live and exclusively on subscription television service WHT The Movie Network.

Allen's most successful album was Bi-Coastal (1980), produced by David Foster and featuring the single "Fly Away", which in 1981 became his only US chart single, reaching No. 55 on the Billboard Hot 100. In addition, Allen co-wrote the Patti LaBelle hit "I Don't Go Shopping", which reached the top 30 on the R&B chart in 1980.

Allen co-wrote the song "Arthur's Theme (Best That You Can Do)" with Burt Bacharach, Carole Bayer Sager and Christopher Cross, for the 1981 film Arthur. The song reached number one in the US and the songwriters won an Academy Award for Best Song. One lyric for the song, "If you get caught between the moon and New York City", was adapted from an earlier song that he and Bayer Sager co-wrote. Allen and Bayer Sager also co-wrote "You and Me (We Wanted It All)", which was recorded by Frank Sinatra. A video of Sinatra singing the song at Carnegie Hall was included as part of the Sinatra: New York live performance box set, released in late 2009.

Allen performed on Australian television for many important occasions: in front of Queen Elizabeth II in 1980 at the Sydney Opera House, before Prince Charles and Princess Diana, once in Melbourne and again in Sydney in 1981, at the opening of the Sydney Entertainment Centre in 1983, where he unveiled for the first time his Australian "Flag" shirt, and the 1980 VFL Grand Final in Melbourne. His "Up in One Concert" of 1980 was a big ratings success across the country. When Australia won the America's Cup in 1983, he flew to Perth to sing before an audience of 100,000. In 1988, he opened for Frank Sinatra at Sanctuary Cove, Queensland. In America, he appeared at the 30th anniversary of Disneyland. He returned to recording on Arista with an album entitled Not the Boy Next Door (1983). In 1990, he recorded his final album on RCA Victor, Making Every Moment Count, which featured Melissa Manchester and Harry Connick Jr. The song "Making Every Moment Count", a duet with Manchester, was co-written by Seth Swirsky, who also produced a number of songs he co-wrote with Allen, including Allen's last-released single, "Tonight You Made My Day".

One of his songs, '"I Still Call Australia Home", became popular through its use in television commercials, initially for National Panasonic and, since 1987, for Qantas Airways.

Broadway
He made his Broadway debut on 12 January 1971, in Soon, a rock opera that opened at the Ritz Theatre and ran for three performances. He starred in his own one-man revue on Broadway at the Biltmore Theatre, Up in One: More Than a Concert (1979), which ran for 46 performances.

Allen recorded a live album called Captured Live at Carnegie Hall, in which songs from his musical Legs Diamond, were previewed. Legs Diamond opened on Broadway at the Mark Hellinger Theatre on 26 December 1988, with a book co-written by Harvey Fierstein. The musical ran for 64 performances and 72 previews. After Legs Diamond closed he returned to concert work, touring with Bernadette Peters during the summer of 1989. Allen and Bernadette also performed in the 1983 Academy Award broadcast in an extended musical tribute to Irving Berlin.

Other work
He appeared in a cameo role in the film Sgt. Pepper's Lonely Hearts Club Band (1978).
His live version of "Everything Old is New Again" can be heard on the soundtrack of the film All That Jazz (1979).
He was the musical guest at Miss Universe 1981.
He appeared in the 1982 television version of The Pirates of Penzance (as the Pirate King).
He appeared as the "man in studio" in the TV series Miami Vices second-season premiere episode "The Prodigal Son".
He also did a pilot for a new Name That Tune show in 1990, and the pilot for what became CBS's short-lived prime-time game show The Hollywood Game (both projects were produced by Marty Pasetta). He died the day the series, which ended up being hosted by Bob Goen due to Allen's illness, debuted.
Personal life
Though flamboyant on stage, Allen was quite the opposite offstage. He once remarked, "I'm not the let's-tear-his-clothes-off type. I'm fairly quiet. The maniac only comes out when I hit the stage. I have to be a different person offstage. If I were to try to keep that up 24 hours a day, I would have a nervous breakdown." Allen described his stage persona as "a much more interesting person than me. I think that's why I'm in show business, to get to be that other person." He further depicted his stage persona as "someone much taller, much handsomer, with a better hairline." Although Allen described himself as "so boring" when not performing, he enjoyed swimming; wind surfing; skiing; water skiing; sailing; collecting Hawaiian shirts; reading; cooking; and growing flowers, herbs, and vegetables.  He spent so much time working in his yard that he imagined his neighbors thought he was a landscape gardener.

Allen owned a beach house in Leucadia, California (north of San Diego), a place he called a 'shack' in Oak Beach, Queensland, Australia, and a penthouse apartment in Manhattan. While visiting Gregory Connell's mother in Leucadia in 1975, Allen learned she was selling her beach home and so bought his first house with the earnings made from his 1974 song, "I Honestly Love You". The area was quiet and far enough away from Los Angeles that he did not get people dropping in because they were in the neighborhood. He wrote the 1976 song, "Puttin' Out Roots" about his move to Leucadia. The living room of Allen's Leucadia beach house is featured on the cover of his 1979 album, I Could Have Been a Sailor.

Allen met Liza Minnelli in London in October 1964, where she and her mother Judy Garland were performing together at the London Palladium.  Peter and Liza were engaged a month later on 26 November 1964.  They married in New York City on 3 March 1967, formally separated on 9 April 1970, and divorced on 24 July 1974.

Allen became more comfortable with his homosexuality in the early 1970s. He explained, "I was afraid as a teen that if I acknowledged that I preferred my own kind my family would stop loving me. We do tend to underestimate our families." Allen and Gregory Connell met through a mutual friend at the New York cabaret club Reno Sweeney in 1973 where Peter often performed. Greg thought Peter was working too hard for the money he was getting and so helped him get his first band together, while Peter found him gorgeous, sweet, and good-hearted.  According to Allen's biographer Stephen MacLean, Connell was "Peter's big love." Connell, a fashion and print model originally from Texas, attracted major clients such as Coca-Cola and did other lucrative print ads. Moreover, he acted in community and dinner theatres and was a singer/composer who sang lead in a group called "Voice Six". After they got together in 1974, Connell left his modeling career to support Allen's music career by becoming his lighting and staging director and tour manager. This arrangement enabled them to be together while Allen performed around the world. Connell also sang backup on Allen's 1976 song, "I Go to Rio". He did so much work behind the scenes that Peter once remarked, "Gregory does everything but get up here and sing!". After becoming ill in late 1982, Connell died from AIDS-related cancer on 11 September 1984, at their home in Leucadia.

Although Allen wrote "Once Before I Go" in 1982 for good friend Ann-Margret to use as a closing song at her concerts, the song took on new meaning when he sang it. According to the song's co-writer Dean Pitchford, Allen told him that "it was the one song he related most to Greg; that he thought of Greg as he sang it, Greg behind the lights (he was Allen's lighting director) at all of his shows." Hence, the lyrics, "You are the light that shines on me, You always were and you'll always be."  Allen further told Pitchford that "after Gregory died, he would always look into the spotlight and imagine that Gregory was behind the light." 

Allen dedicated his 1985 album, Captured Live at Carnegie Hall to Connell and sang songs in his memory at AIDS benefit concerts.McCombs, Phil. "Of Love, Death and Hope; at the Human Rights Campaign Fund Dinner, Focusing on AIDS." The Washington Post, 9 October 1989, p. d01. Via ProQuest. Retrieved 7 March 2021. After Connell's death, Allen poured himself even more into his work. He spent several years getting his musical Legs Diamond on Broadway (it premiered in 1988), recorded his final album Making Every Moment Count in 1990, and continued performing in concerts and doing various benefits until his death in 1992 at the age of 48.

On 26 November 2005, an extension of the Tenterfield Library was opened and named the "George Woolnough Wing", named after Allen's paternal grandfather who was memorialized in his song, "Tenterfield Saddler".

Death and legacy
Allen's last performance was on 26 January 1992, in Sydney, and he was diagnosed with throat cancer shortly after. He spent his final days at his beach house in Leucadia. He died at Mercy Hospital, San Diego, on 18 June 1992, from an AIDS-related throat cancer. A private memorial service was held on 21 June 1992, at his home in Leucadia, where his ashes were scattered in the Pacific Ocean within sight of his house.

A documentary titled The Boy from Oz about Allen was produced after his death, featuring clips from his performances as well as interviews with performers who worked with him.

A stage musical based on his life, also titled The Boy from Oz, opened in Australia in 1998. Using his largely autobiographical songs, the production starred Todd McKenney as Allen and Christina Amphlett of the rock group Divinyls as Judy Garland. In 2003, the musical opened on Broadway, becoming the first Australian musical ever to be performed there. In this production Allen was played by Hugh Jackman, who won a Tony Award for his portrayal in 2004. Jackman performed this role again two years later when the show toured large arenas in Australia under the title The Boy from Oz: Arena Spectacular. A TV mini series, Peter Allen: Not the Boy Next Door, was broadcast in Australia in 2015 with Joel Jackson playing the adult Allen and Ky Baldwin playing him as a youth. Supporting roles were played by Rebecca Gibney as Marion Woolnough (Allen's mother), Sarah West as Liza Minnelli and Sigrid Thornton as Judy Garland.

Allen was inducted into the ARIA Hall of Fame in 1993.

In popular culture
During the closing few moments of the final episode of The Late Late Show with Tom Snyder, during a video/photo montage, Allen's "Once Before I Go" played in the background

Don Lane performed "Once Before I Go" on his last ever episode of "The Don Lane Show".

In the 1979 film All That Jazz, Allen's live rendition of "Everything Old Is New Again" is danced to by Ann Reinking and Erzebet Foldi for Roy Scheider's character Joe Gideon based on dancer Bob Fosse.

In the 18th episode of season three of Glee, actor Chris Colfer as Kurt Hummel performs “The Boy Next Door” for his initial audition to NYADA, eschewing “Music of the Night” from Phantom of the Opera in favor of the unconventional choice. While he's initially rejected, the song lays the groundwork for a second audition.

Hugh Jackman's performance of Allen's "Once Before I Go" (from The Boy from Oz) was featured in a montage dedicated to Alex Trebek in his final episode of Jeopardy! which aired on January 8, 2021, two months after Trebek's death from stage IV pancreatic cancer on November 8, 2020 at the age of 80.

La Casa Azul's song Terry, Peter y yo makes reference to Allen, Judy Garland, and Liza Minnelli: 

Discography
Studio albums

Live albums

Compilation albums

Singles

Notes

Awards
Academy Awards
Peter Allen won an Academy Award (Oscar) for Best Original Song for "Arthur's Theme (Best That You Can Do)" in 1981.
 (wins only)
|-
| 54th Academy Awards
| Peter Allen, Burt Bacharach, Christopher Cross, & Carole Bayer Sager
| Best Original Song - Arthur's Theme (Best That You Can Do)
| 
|-

ARIA Music Awards
The ARIA Music Awards is an annual awards ceremony that recognises excellence, innovation, and achievement across all genres of Australian music. They commenced in 1987. Allen was inducted into the Hall of Fame in 1993. Note: shows inductees from 1999 to 2008, inclusive.

|-
| ARIA Music Awards of 1993
| Peter Allen
| ARIA Hall of Fame
| 

Golden Globes
Peter Allen won a Golden Globe for Best Original Song for "Arthur's Theme (Best That You Can Do)" in 1981.
 (wins only)
|-
| 39th Golden Globe Awards
| Peter Allen, Burt Bacharach, Christopher Cross, & Carole Bayer Sager
| Best Original Song - Arthur's Theme (Best That You Can Do)
| 
|-

GRAMMY Awards

Peter Allen was nominated twice for a GRAMMY Award for Song Of The Year in 1974 for "I Honestly Love You" and in 1981 for "Arthur's Theme (Best That You Can Do)".
 (wins only)
|-
| 24th Annual GRAMMY Awards
| Peter Allen & Jeff Barry
| Song Of The Year - I Honestly Love You (Single)
| 
|-
| 17th Annual GRAMMY Awards
| Peter Allen, Burt Bacharach, Christopher Cross, & Carole Bayer Sager 
| Song Of The Year - Arthur's Theme (Best That You Can Do)
| 
|-

Mo Awards
The Australian Entertainment Mo Awards (commonly known informally as the Mo Awards), were annual Australian entertainment industry awards. They recognise achievements in live entertainment in Australia from 1975 to 2016. Peter Allen won two awards in that time.
 (wins only)
|-
| 1983
| Peter Allen
| International Act of the Year
| 
|-
| 1984
| Peter Allen
| International Act of the Year
| 
|-

Order of Australia
The Order of Australia is an honour that recognises Australian citizens and other persons for outstanding achievement and service. It was established on 14 February 1975 by Elizabeth II, Queen of Australia, on the advice of the Australian Government.
 (wins only)
|-
| 1990
| Peter Allen
| Order of Australia, Member in the General Division (AM) - for service to the performing arts, particularly as a songwriter.
| 
|-

ReferencesSources'''

Further reading
 David Smith and Neal Peters, Peter Allen: Between The Moon and New York City (Delilah Press, 1983)
 Stephen Maclean, Peter Allen: The Boy From Oz'' (Random House Australia, 1995)
 Frank Van Straten, "Peter Allen AM 1944–1992" (Live Performance Australia – Hall of Fame, 2007)

External links
 
 
 Peter Allen bio and recordings
 Peter Allen Exhibition Website
 Peter Allen Collection, including his personal archive and costumes, at the Performing Arts Collection, Arts Centre Melbourne

1944 births
1992 deaths
20th-century Australian male singers
20th-century Australian pianists
A&M Records artists
AIDS-related deaths in California
ARIA Hall of Fame inductees
Australian activists
Australian expatriates in the United Kingdom
Australian expatriates in the United States
Australian male singer-songwriters
Australian pianists
Australian rock singers
Best Original Song Academy Award-winning songwriters
Golden Globe Award-winning musicians
Cabaret singers
Australian gay musicians
Gay singers
Australian LGBT singers
Australian LGBT songwriters
Gay songwriters
People from New England (New South Wales)
Male pianists
Deaths from cancer in California
Deaths from throat cancer
20th-century Australian LGBT people